Chris Evert took her fourth consecutive US Clay Court title and $10,000 first-prize money, defeating Dianne Fromholtz in the final.

Seeds
A champion seed is indicated in bold text while text in italics indicates the round in which that seed was eliminated.

Draw

Finals

Top half

Section 1

Section 2

Bottom half

Section 3

Section 4

References

U.S. Clay Court Championships
1975 U.S. Clay Court Championships